John Allison (1884 – after 1908) was an English professional footballer who played three games for Football League side Gainsborough Trinity in the 1907–08 season.

References

1884 births
Year of death missing
People from Brigg
English footballers
Association football inside forwards
Kiveton Park F.C. players
Gainsborough Trinity F.C. players
Sutton Junction F.C. players
Mansfield Town F.C. players
English Football League players